Vahan is a village in the Chambarak Municipality of the Gegharkunik Province of Armenia. Nearby upon a hill towards the eastern end of the village is an early Iron Age cyclopean fort.

Etymology 
When the village was founded in 1925, it was named Ordzhonikidze in honor of Soviet politician and politburo member, Sergo Ordzhonikidze.

Gallery

References

External links 
 
 

Populated places in Gegharkunik Province
Populated places established in 1925
Cities and towns built in the Soviet Union